Mechâal Baladiat Béjaïa is a volleyball team in Algeria.

Previous Names
Mechâal Baladiat Béjaïa (177–Present)

Team Roster
2013-2014

Technical and managerial staff

Honors

National Achievements
Algerian Championship :
 Winners (1 title) : (2012)
 Runners up (3 vice champions) : (1996, 2003, 2006)

Algerian Cup :
 Runners up (1 vice champions) : (2003)

Head coaches

As of 2014

Notable players
 Mouni Abderrahim
 Fatima Zahra Djouad
 Narimène Madani
 Nawal Mansouri
 Wissem Dali

External links
  Site officiel Mechâal Baladiat Béjaïa

References

Algerian volleyball clubs
Volleyball clubs established in 1977
1977 establishments in Algeria